Wakaya is a privately owned island in Fiji's Lomaiviti Archipelago. Situated at 17.65° South and 179.02° East, it covers an area of eight square kilometres (3 square miles).  It is 18 kilometres (11 miles) from Ovalau, the main island in the Lomaiviti Group.

The coastal-marine ecosystem of the island contributes to its national significance as outlined in Fiji's Biodiversity Strategy and Action Plan. It was purchased by businessman David Gilmour who also developed the island. It was sold to the controversial Seagram's heiress Clare Bronfman who now has majority interest in the island.

History 
Beginning around 300 B.C., Wakaya Island was inhabited by Pacific Islanders. They lived in a village called Korolevu. Wakaya was not at peace at that time as other villagers from nearby Ovalau came in boats to make war and kidnap the Wakayan women. Ultimately, the Ovalau villagers came and wiped out all the men and kidnapped all the women. To avoid a gruesome death at the hands of the Ovalau warriors, the Wakayan village chief jumped off a Wakayan cliff at Double Bay and drowned in the ocean. That cliff is now called "Chieftain's Leap" in his honor.

Another interesting event was the passage past Wakaya of Captain William Bligh who sailed there in 1789. Approximately two hundred years later, David Gilmour "discovered" the island on a trip to Fiji. He found it uninhabited and decided to repopulate Wakaya.

The first attempt to produce sugar in Fiji was on Wakaya Island in 1862 but this was a financial failure. In 1877, the island was bought by Captain Frederick Lennox Langdale (1853-1913), a former Royal Navy officer, who later served on the Legislative Council of Fiji before being appointed governor's commissioner at Cakaudrove.

Private ownership and development
Wakaya was bought in 1973 by David Gilmour, a gold-mining entrepreneur who has developed the island, building 22 kilometres of roads, a freshwater reservoir, an airstrip, a marina, jetty, village, church, gym, school with Noe Ceinaturaga Duncan as head teacher. The island also had a recently upgraded airway runway for an airport. Gilmour also developed the Wakaya Club, an exclusive resort.  The club has 10 luxury bungalows with a staff of 300.  It also houses a large private villa and has four private beaches. Wakaya's population is about 300-600 people.

Change of ownership
In 2016, a majority of Wakaya Island (80%) was sold to Seagrams heiress Clare Bronfman, who was convicted in 2019 of financing a human trafficking ring known as NXIVM. She was sentenced to 6 years in September 2020. Her co-conspirators, Keith Raniere and actress Allison Mack, sentencing is currently postponed due to COVID-19 pandemic.

In popular culture

Sections of the 1983 pirate adventure film Nate and Hayes (also known as Savage Islands) were filmed on Wakaya.

References 

Islands of Fiji
Lomaiviti Province
Private islands of Fiji
Preliminary Register of Sites of National Significance in Fiji